Panathinaikos AC Baseball Team is a Greek baseball club. The current iteration was founded in 2014. Panathinaikos was the first club which organized a baseball game in Greece in 1946.

History

After the end of World War II, Panathinaikos A.O attempted to create new sections in the stadium of Leoforou after they repaired it from the damages of Nazi occupation and placed headlights and the new sports ground at the junction of Queen Sophia and Tsoha. Among the sports that were selected was baseball, basketball and handball.

In April 1946, the USS Missouri sailed into the bay Phalericon. The Missouri had top sporting facilities aboard and  exceptional athletes serving on its crew. Kostas Zogas, a Panathinaikos athlete, organized baseball, basketball and hockey games. On 11 April 1946 the Tennis Avenue hosted the first recorded baseball game in Greece between the American warships Missouri and Providence. The second baseball game in Greece was held on Golf Avenue on June 3, 1955. A team of Americans and Greek soldiers prevailed by a score of 14-10.

The department of Panathinaikos baseball was created in March 2014. The first official appearance of the team was the participation in the Greek Cup games against Aris Baseball Club ArisThessaloniki.

Honours
 Greek Baseball League: (1)
 2014

2015 roster

Source: baseballstats.eu

References

Panathinaikos A.O.
Baseball teams in Greece